is a cantata composed in 1935 and 1936 by Carl Orff, based on 24 poems from the medieval collection Carmina Burana. It was first performed by the Oper Frankfurt on 8 June 1937. It is part of Trionfi, a musical triptych that also includes Catulli Carmina and Trionfo di Afrodite. The first and last sections of the piece are called "" ("Fortune, Empress of the World") and start with "O Fortuna".

Text 

In 1934, Orff encountered the 1847 edition of the Carmina Burana by Johann Andreas Schmeller, the original text dating mostly from the 11th or 12th century, including some from the 13th century.  was a young law student and an enthusiast of Latin and Greek; he assisted Orff in the selection and organization of 24 of these poems into a libretto mostly in secular Latin verse, with a small amount of Middle High German and Old French. The selection covers a wide range of topics, as familiar in the 13th century as they are in the 21st century: the fickleness of fortune and wealth, the ephemeral nature of life, the joy of the return of spring and the pleasures and perils of drinking, gluttony, gambling, and lust.

Structure 
Carmina Burana is structured into five major sections, containing 25 movements in total, including one repeated movement and one purely instrumental one. Orff indicates attacca markings between all the movements within each scene.

{| class=wikitable
 |-
 !
 !colspan=2| Fortuna Imperatrix Mundi
 !colspan=2| Fortune, Empress of the World
 |-
 | 1
 | O Fortuna || Latin
 | O Fortune || choir
 |-
 | 2
 | Fortune plango vulnera || Latin
 | I lament the wounds that Fortune deals || choir
 |-
 ! 
 !colspan=2| Primo vere
 !colspan=2| In Spring
 |-
 | 3
 | Veris leta facies || Latin
 | The joyous face of Spring || small choir
 |-
 | 4
 | Omnia Sol temperat || Latin
 | All things are tempered by the Sun || baritone
 |-
 | 5
 | Ecce gratum || Latin
 | Behold the welcome || choir
 |-
 !
 !colspan=2| Uf dem anger
 !colspan=2| In the Meadow
 |-
 | 6
 | Tanz ||   || Dance || instrumental
 |-
 | 7
 | Floret silva nobilis || Latin / Middle High German
 | The noble woods are burgeoning || choir
 |-
 | 8
 | Chramer, gip die varwe mir || Middle High German
 | Monger, give me coloured paint || 2 choirs (small and large)
 |-
 | 9
 | (a) Reie ||
 | Round dance || instrumental
 |-
 |
 | (b) Swaz hie gat umbe || Middle High German
 | They who here go dancing around || choir
 |-
 |
 | (c) Chume, chum, geselle min || Middle High German
 | Come, come, my dear companion || small choir
 |-
 |
 | (d) Swaz hie gat umbe (reprise) || Middle High German
 | They who here go dancing around || choir
 |-
 | 10
 | Were diu werlt alle min || Middle High German
 | If the whole world were but mine || choir
 |-
 ! 
 !colspan=2| In Taberna
 !colspan=2| In the Tavern
 |-
 | 11
 | Estuans interius || Latin
 | Seething inside || baritone
 |-
 | 12
 | Olim lacus colueram || Latin
 | Once I swam in lakes || tenor, choir (male)
 |-
 | 13
 | Ego sum abbas || Latin
 | I am the abbot (of Cockaigne) || baritone, choir (male)
 |-
 | 14
 | In taberna quando sumus || Latin
 | When we are in the tavern || choir (male)
 |-
 ! 
 !colspan=2| Cour d'amours
 !colspan=2| Court of Love
 |-
 | 15
 | Amor volat undique || Latin
 | Love flies everywhere || soprano, boys' choir
 |-
 | 16
 | Dies, nox et omnia || Latin / Old French
 | Day, night and everything || baritone
 |-
 | 17
 | Stetit puella || Latin
 | There stood a girl || soprano
 |-
 | 18
 | Circa mea pectora || Latin / Middle High German
 | In my breast || baritone, choir
 |-
 | 19
 | Si puer cum puellula || Latin
 | If a boy with a girl || 3 tenors, 1 baritone, 2 basses
 |-
 | 20
 | Veni, veni, venias || Latin
 | Come, come, pray come || double choir
 |-
 | 21
 | In trutina || Latin
 | On the scales || soprano
 |-
 | 22
 | Tempus est iocundum || Latin
 | Time to jest || soprano, baritone, choir, boys' choir
 |-
 | 23
 | Dulcissime || Latin
 | Sweetest boy || soprano
 |-
 !
 !colspan=2| Blanziflor et Helena
 !colspan=2| Blancheflour and Helen
 |-
 | 24
 | Ave formosissima || Latin
 | Hail to the most lovely || choir
 |-
 !
 !colspan=2| Fortuna Imperatrix Mundi
 !colspan=2| Fortune, Empress of the World
 |-
 | 25
 | O Fortuna (reprise) || Latin
 | O Fortune || choir
 |}

Much of the compositional structure is based on the idea of the turning Fortuna Wheel. The drawing of the wheel found on the first page of the Burana Codex includes four phrases around the outside of the wheel:

Within each scene, and sometimes within a single movement, the wheel of fortune turns, joy turning to bitterness, and hope turning to grief. "O Fortuna", the first poem in the Schmeller edition, completes this circle, forming a compositional frame for the work through being both the opening and closing movements.

Staging 

Orff subscribed to a dramatic concept called "Theatrum Mundi" in which music, movement, and speech were inseparable. Babcock writes that "Orff's artistic formula limited the music in that every musical moment was to be connected with an action on stage. It is here that modern performances of Carmina Burana fall short of Orff's intentions." Orff subtitled Carmina Burana a "scenic cantata" in his intention to stage the work with dance, choreography, visual design and other stage action; the piece is now usually performed in concert halls as a cantata.

A danced version of Carmina Burana was choreographed by Loyce Houlton for the Minnesota Dance Theatre in 1978. In honour of Orff's 80th birthday, an acted and choreographed film version was filmed, directed by Jean-Pierre Ponnelle for the German broadcaster ZDF; Orff collaborated in its production.

Kent Stowell choreographed the work for Pacific Northwest Ballet in Seattle. It premiered on October 5, 1993, with scenic design by Ming Cho Lee.

Musical style 

Orff's style demonstrates a desire for directness of speech and of access. Carmina Burana contains little or no development in the classical sense, and polyphony is also conspicuously absent. Carmina Burana avoids overt harmonic complexities, a fact which many musicians and critics have pointed out, such as Ann Powers of The New York Times.

Orff was influenced melodically by late Renaissance and early Baroque models including William Byrd and Claudio Monteverdi. It is a common misconception that Orff based the melodies of Carmina Burana on neumeatic melodies; while many of the lyrics in the Burana Codex are enhanced with neumes, almost none of these melodies had been deciphered at the time of Orff's composition, and none of them had served Orff as a melodic model. His shimmering orchestration shows a deference to Stravinsky. In particular, Orff's music is very reminiscent of Stravinsky's earlier work, Les noces (The Wedding).

Rhythm, for Orff as it was for Stravinsky, is often the primary musical element. Over all, it sounds rhythmically straightforward and simple, but the metre will change freely from one measure to the next. While the rhythmic arc in a section is taken as a whole, a measure of five may be followed by one of seven, to one of four, and so on, often with caesura marked between them. These constant rhythmic changes combined with the caesura create a very "conversational" feel – so much so that the rhythmic complexities of the piece are often overlooked.

Some of the solo arias pose bold challenges for singers: the only solo tenor aria, Olim lacus colueram, is often sung almost completely in falsetto to demonstrate the suffering of the character (in this case, a roasting swan). The baritone arias often demand high notes not commonly found in baritone repertoire, and parts of the baritone aria Dies nox et omnia are often sung in falsetto, a rare example in baritone repertoire. Also noted is the solo soprano aria, Dulcissime which demands extremely high notes. Orff intended this aria for a lyric soprano, not a coloratura, so that the musical tensions would be more obvious.

Instrumentation 
Carmina Burana is scored for a large orchestra consisting of:

Reception 
Shortly after the greatly successful premiere, Orff said the following to his publisher, Schott Music: "Everything I have written to date, and which you have, unfortunately, printed, can be destroyed. With Carmina Burana, my collected works begin."

Several performances were repeated elsewhere in Germany. The Nazi regime was at first nervous about the erotic tone of some of the poems, but eventually embraced the piece. It became the most famous piece of music composed in Germany at the time. The popularity of the work continued to rise after the war, and by the 1960s Carmina Burana was well established as part of the international classic repertoire. The piece was voted number 62 at the Classic 100 Ten Years On and is at number 144 of the 2020 Classic FM Hall of Fame.

Alex Ross wrote that "the music itself commits no sins simply by being and remaining popular. That Carmina Burana has appeared in hundreds of films and television commercials is proof that it contains no diabolical message, indeed that it contains no message whatsoever."

Subsequent arrangements 
The popularity of the work has ensured the creation of many additional arrangements for a variety of performing forces.

In 1956, Orff's disciple Wilhelm Killmayer created a reduced version for soloists, SATB mixed choir, children's choir, two pianos and six percussion (timpani + 5), and was authorized by Orff. The score has short solos for three tenors, baritone and two basses. This version is to allow smaller ensembles the opportunity to perform the piece.

A performance of this arrangement was recorded by the North Texas Wind Symphony under Eugene Corporon. In writing this transcription, Mas Quiles maintained the original chorus, percussion, and piano parts.

Notable recordings 

 Herbert Blomstedt with the San Francisco Symphony, and the San Francisco Symphony Chorus, led by Vance George, won the Grammy Award for Best Choral Performance in 1992. The recording was released by Decca on October 11, 1991.
 Rafael Frühbeck de Burgos with the New Philharmonia Orchestra, the New Philharmonia Chorus (chorus master: Wilhelm Pitz), Wandsworth School Boys' Choir, John Noble, Raymond Wolansky, Lucia Popp, Emi, 1966.
 Seiji Ozawa with the Boston Symphony Orchestra, Children's Chorus Of The New England Conservatory, New England Conservatory Chorus, Evelyn Mandac, Stanley Kolk, Sherrill Milnes, RCA, 1970.
 Charles Dutoit with the Orchestre Symphonique de Montréal and Saint Lawrence Choir (Beverly Hoch (s), Stanford Olsen (t), Mark Oswald (bar). 1997, Decca 028945529028. High quality recording technically (balancing orchestra and choir)
Both the film adaptation and recording were endorsed by Carl Orff himself (Orff also collaborated on the film in honour of his 80th birthday)
 Eugen Jochum (conductor) with the Bavarian Radio Symphony Orchestra and the Bavarian Radio Chorus (Chor und Symphonieorchester des Bayerischen Rundfunks), Munich, Germany, with choir master Josef Kugler, as part of Trionfi: Carmina Burana (recorded October 1952) with Elfriede Trötschel (soprano), Paul Kuën (tenor), Hans Braun (baritone); reissued in 2012 on Major Classics, M2CD016, 5 060294 540168
 Eugen Jochum with the choir and orchestra of the Deutsche Oper Berlin and Gundula Janowitz, Gerhard Stolze, and Dietrich Fischer-Dieskau. Recorded October 1967 in Berlin's Ufa-Studio, released 1968 (Deutsche Grammophon). This version was also endorsed by Carl Orff himself and was the first choice of the BBC Radio 3 CD Review "Building a Library" review in 1995.
Recorded and released 1960 (VEB Deutsche Schallplatten). Orff himself loved this version.
 Ferdinand Leitner with the Kölner Rundfunk-Sinfonie Orchester, the Kölner Rundfunkchor led by Herbert Shernus, and the Tölzer Knabenchor, led by Gerhard Schmidt-Gaden, was "Carl Orff's authorized recording"; Ruth-Margret Pütz (soprano), Michael Cousins (tenor), Barry McDaniel (baritone), Roland Hermann (bass). Released 1973 by Acanta and as part of seven CD set "Carl Orff Collection" (Acanta, 1992) and on Arts Archives (2003).
 James Levine with Chicago Symphony Orchestra and Chorus and June Anderson, Philip Creech, and Bernd Weikl. Recorded 1984 (Deutsche Grammophon). This version won the 1987 Grammy Award for Best Choral Performance.
Ray Manzarek, keyboard player for the Doors, produced by Philip Glass and Kurt Munkacsi. Arrangements by Ray Manzarek. Carmina Burana, released 1983 on A&M Records. Genres: Rock music, Progressive rock, Art rock.
 Riccardo Muti with Philharmonia Orchestra and Chorus and Arleen Auger, John van Kesteren and Jonathan Summers. Recorded 1979 (EMI), featured in the top three of BBC Radio 3's review and is also recommended by Classics Today.
 New York Choral Society accompanied by Jeffrey Reid Baker using synthesizers. A 1988 recording.
 Eugene Ormandy, with the Philadelphia Orchestra and the Rutgers University Choir, Recorded and released, 1960, reissued, 1987 CBS Masterworks Records
 Seiji Ozawa with the Berlin Philharmonic and Shin-Yu Kai Chorus; Kathleen Battle, Frank Lopardo and Thomas Allen; 1990 Philips DVD video.
 Simon Rattle with the Berlin Philharmonic and Berlin Radio Choir; Sally Matthews, Lawrence Brownlee and Christian Gerhaher; 2005 EMI Classics. Very fast, percussive emphasis.
 Robert Shaw with the Atlanta Symphony Orchestra, Atlanta Symphony Orchestra Chorus, and Atlanta Boy Choir; Judith Blegen (sop.), William Brown (ten.), and Håkan Hagegård (bar.); recorded 1981, released 1983 by Telarc.
 Leonard Slatkin with St. Louis Symphony Orchestra and Chorus, RCA 09026 61673-2, featured in the top three of BBC Radio 3's review
 Leopold Stokowski with the Houston Symphony, Guy Gardner, Virginia Babikian, Clyde Hager, the Houston Chorale and the Houston Youth Symphony Boys Choir. Released 1959 Capitol Records
 John Williams with the  Boston Pops at the 1996 Summer Olympics in Atlanta.
 Christian Thielemann with the choir and orchestra of the Deutsche Oper Berlin and Knabenchor Berlin. Released 1999 by Deutsche Grammophon GmbH, Hamburg. Named "Editor's Choice" by Gramophone
 Michael Tilson Thomas with the Cleveland Orchestra, Chorus and Boys Choir; Judith Blegen, Kenneth Riegel and Peter Binder; recorded 1974, released 1975 CBS Records (quadrophonic); CD re-release 1990 MK 33172 CBS Records Masterworks. This recording was used in Michael Smuin's 1997 ballet Carmina Burana, choreographed for Smuin Ballet.
 Jos Van Immerseel with Anima Eterna Brugge, Collegium Vocale Gent, and Cantate Domino; Yeree Suh (sop.), Yves Saelens (ten.) and Thomas Bauer (bar.); 2014 Zigzag. Recorded on period instruments.

References 

Sources

Further reading 
 
 Babcock, Jonathan. "Carl Orff's Carmina Burana: A Fresh Approach to the Work's Performance Practice". Choral Journal 45, no. 11 (May 2006): 26–40.
 Fassone, Alberto: "Carl Orff", in: The New Grove Dictionary of Music and Musicians, London: Macmillan 2001.
 Lo, Kii-Ming, "Sehen, Hören und Begreifen: Jean-Pierre Ponnelles Verfilmung der Carmina Burana von Carl Orff", in: Thomas Rösch (ed.), Text, Musik, Szene – Das Musiktheater von Carl Orff, Mainz etc. (Schott) 2015, pp. 147–173.
 Steinberg, Michael. "Carl Orff: Carmina Burana". Choral Masterworks: A Listener's Guide. Oxford: Oxford University Press, 2005, 230–242.
 Werner Thomas: Das Rad der Fortuna – Ausgewählte Aufsätze zu Werk und Wirkung Carl Orffs, Schott, Mainz 1990, .

External links 

 , Coro Sinfônico Comunitário da Universidade de Brasília
 Website about Carl Orff's Carmina Burana, Charles Cave
 Text, original and translated in English, as it appears in Orff's libretto
 Program notes on Carmina Burana, 28 March 2004, Mendelssohn Club of Philadelphia
 "The Lasting Appeal of Orff's Carmina Burana", sound files and transcription at NPR
 Full lyrics to Carmina Burana
 "Carl Orff: Carmina Burana" (complete performance, 1:11 hours), University Chorus and Alumni Chorus, UC Davis Symphony Orchestra and the Pacific Boychoir at the Mondavi Center (4 June 2006)
 "The Story of the Carmina Burana", Radio Netherlands Archives, December 19, 2004

Cantatas
Compositions by Carl Orff
1937 compositions

ja:カルミナ・ブラーナ#カール・オルフの「カルミナ・ブラーナ」